Johannes August Röring (born 16 May 1959) is a German politician. Born in Vreden, North Rhine-Westphalia, he represents the CDU. Johannes Röring has served as a member of the Bundestag from the state of North Rhine-Westphalia since 2005.

Life 
He became member of the bundestag after the 2005 German federal election. He is a member of the Committee for Food and Agriculture.

References

External links 

  
 Bundestag biography 

1959 births
Living people
Members of the Bundestag for North Rhine-Westphalia
Members of the Bundestag 2017–2021
Members of the Bundestag 2013–2017
Members of the Bundestag 2009–2013
Members of the Bundestag 2005–2009
Members of the Bundestag for the Christian Democratic Union of Germany